Giovanni Girolamo Naselli (1640–1709) was a Roman Catholic prelate who served as Bishop of Luni e Sarzana (1695–1709) 
and Bishop of Ventimiglia (1685–1695).

Biography
Giovanni Girolamo Naselli was born in Savona, Italy on 30 December 1640.
On 10 September 1685, he was appointed during the papacy of Pope Innocent XI as Bishop of Ventimiglia.
On 23 September 1685, he was consecrated bishop by Francesco Nerli (iuniore), Cardinal-Priest of San Matteo in Merulana. 
On 7 February 1695, he was appointed during the papacy of Pope Innocent XII as Bishop of Luni e Sarzana.
He served as Bishop of Luni e Sarzana until his death in August 1709.

References

External links and additional sources
 (for Chronology of Bishops) 
 (for Chronology of Bishops) 
 (for Chronology of Bishops) 
 (for Chronology of Bishops) 

17th-century Italian Roman Catholic bishops
18th-century Italian Roman Catholic bishops
Bishops appointed by Pope Innocent XI
Bishops appointed by Pope Innocent XII
1640 births
1709 deaths